The Archdiocese of Warsaw is a Catholic ecclesiastical territory or diocese in Poland encompassing the Polish capital. It was erected on October 16, 1798. 
It was elevated to an Archdiocese on June 30, 1813.

A Metropolitan See, its suffragan dioceses are the Roman Catholic Diocese of Płock and the Roman Catholic Diocese of Warszawa-Praga.
According to the church's statistics, 30.4% of the dioceses population attended a church weekly in 2013. That is higher than a year earlier (29.8%) but church attendance may still be declining.

Archbishop of Warsaw

The current archbishop, Kazimierz Nycz, formerly Bishop of Koszalin-Kolobrzeg, Poland, was named on 3 March 2007. Following the abrupt resignation of Archbishop Stanisław Wielgus in January, Józef Cardinal Glemp had been named its Apostolic Administrator.

See List of bishops and archbishops of Warsaw for all ordinarily of this diocese, as well as auxiliary bishops.

See also
 List of bishops and archbishops of Warsaw

References

External links

Christianity in Warsaw
Roman Catholic dioceses in Poland
Religious organizations established in 1798